The Ballachulish Bridge is a bridge in the West Highlands of Scotland.

It crosses the narrows (Caolas mhic Phadruig - Patrick's Narrows) between Loch Leven and Loch Linnhe, linking the villages of South Ballachulish (Argyll) and North Ballachulish (Inverness-shire). It carries the A82 road, the main route between Glasgow and Inverness.

The bridge was built by the Cleveland Bridge & Engineering Company and opened in 1975, replacing the Ballachulish ferry. It is a two-lane road bridge of through steel truss construction with fabricated box chords. It was designed by W.A. Fairhurst and Partners of Newcastle upon Tyne. It is 964 feet long.

References

Bridges completed in 1975
Road bridges in Scotland
Bridges in Highland (council area)